Dance to the Music may refer to:
Dance to the Music (Sly and the Family Stone album), a 1968 album by Sly & the Family Stone
"Dance to the Music (song)", a 1968 hit single from said album
Dance to the Music (Bruce Haack album), a 1972 album by Bruce Haack

See also
A Dance to the Music of Time, a twelve-volume cycle of novels by Anthony Powell